Alois Schwarz (16 June 1965 – January 1999) was an Austrian cross-country skier. He competed at the 1988 Winter Olympics and the 1992 Winter Olympics.

References

1965 births
1999 deaths
Austrian male cross-country skiers
Olympic cross-country skiers of Austria
Cross-country skiers at the 1988 Winter Olympics
Cross-country skiers at the 1992 Winter Olympics
Sportspeople from Linz
20th-century Austrian people